The Salt River is a river in the United States Virgin Islands.

Rivers of the United States Virgin Islands